Chromis chrysura, the stout chromis, is a diurnal species of damselfish belonging to the genus Chromis. Several isolated populations of the species have been found. The first is in Taiwan, the Ryukyu Islands and Southern Japan, the second one lies in the Coral Sea in New Caledonia, Vanuatu, Fiji, and Eastern Australia, and the third one lies in the Western Indian Ocean in Mauritius and Réunion. It is also found in the Philippines and is possibly found in India. It inhabits outer coral or rocky reefs. It usually forms large aggregations in shallow waters and feeds on zooplankton. It is oviparous, and the males of the species guard and aerate the eggs.

References

chrysura
Fish of the Pacific Ocean
Fish described in 1883
Fish of the Indian Ocean